Mohamed Ehuttar Hadjiar Mohamed Ali (27 March 1925 – 31 December 2004) was a Ceylonese politician and Member of Parliament.

Early life and family
Mohamed Ali was born on 27 March 1925 near Kinniya in eastern Ceylon. His brother was M. E. H. Maharoof.

Career
Mohamed Ali was chairman of Kinniya Village Council.

Mohamed Ali stood as the Communist Party candidate in Mutur at the 1947 parliamentary election but was defeated by the United National Party candidate A. R. A. M. Abubucker. He stood as an independent candidate in Mutur at the 1952 parliamentary election. He won the election and entered Parliament. He was re-elected at the 1956 and March 1960 parliamentary elections as an independent candidate. He stood as the United National Party (UNP) candidate in Mutur at the July 1960 parliamentary election but failed to get re-elected.

Mohamed Ali played a leading role in the 1961 satyagraha campaign organised by Illankai Tamil Arasu Kachchi (ITAK). Following the death of ITAK MP T. Ahambaram, Mohamed Ali contested the Mutur by-election on 28 June 1962 as the ITAK candidate and was re-elected to Parliament. He was re-elected at the 1965 parliamentary election. He stood as the UNP candidate in Mutur at the 1970 parliamentary election but failed to get re-elected.

Mohamed Ali later served as Ceylonese ambassador to Maldives, and deputy chairman of the Paddy Marketing Board. He died on 31 December 2004 at his home.

References

1925 births
2004 deaths
Communist Party of Sri Lanka politicians
Illankai Tamil Arasu Kachchi politicians
Local authority councillors of Sri Lanka
Members of the 2nd Parliament of Ceylon
Members of the 3rd Parliament of Ceylon
Members of the 4th Parliament of Ceylon
Members of the 5th Parliament of Ceylon
Members of the 6th Parliament of Ceylon
People from Eastern Province, Sri Lanka
People from British Ceylon
Sri Lankan Moor politicians
Sri Lankan Muslims
United National Party politicians